Group Processes & Intergroup Relations is a bimonthly peer-reviewed academic journal that covers research in the field of social psychology, including organizational and management sciences, political science, sociology, language and communication, cross cultural psychology, and intergroup relations, among others. The journal's editors-in-chief are Dominic Abrams (University of Kent) and Michael Hogg (Claremont Graduate University). It was established in 1998 and is currently published by SAGE Publications.

Abstracting and indexing 
Group Processes & Intergroup Relations is abstracted and indexed in Scopus and the Social Sciences Citation Index. According to the Journal Citation Reports, its 2012 impact factor is 1.528, ranking it 28th out of 60 in the category "Psychology, Social".

References

External links
 

Sociology journals
SAGE Publishing academic journals
English-language journals
Bimonthly journals
Publications established in 1998